Joachim Kunz (born 9 February 1959) is a German weightlifter who competed for East Germany in the 1980 Summer Olympics and in the 1988 Summer Olympics. He was born in Stollberg.

At the 1980 Summer Olympics in Moscow he won a silver medal in the  class. He won gold at the 1981 and 1983 World Championships. At the 1988 Summer Olympics in Seoul he won a gold medal in the  class.

As of 2008, Kunz is head of German instant soup manufacturer Suppina.

References

External links 
 

1959 births
Living people
People from Stollberg
German male weightlifters
Olympic weightlifters of East Germany
Olympic gold medalists for East Germany
Olympic silver medalists for East Germany
Weightlifters at the 1980 Summer Olympics
Weightlifters at the 1988 Summer Olympics
World record setters in weightlifting
Olympic medalists in weightlifting
Medalists at the 1980 Summer Olympics
Medalists at the 1988 Summer Olympics
Recipients of the Patriotic Order of Merit in gold
People from Bezirk Karl-Marx-Stadt
Sportspeople from Saxony